Taphrocerus is a genus of beetles in the family Buprestidae, the jewel beetles. As of 2014 there are 174 described species. All are native to the New World except a single species described from South Africa.

Species include:

 Taphrocerus achardi Obenberger, 1924
 Taphrocerus acutus Obenberger, 1924
 Taphrocerus aeneocollis Fisher, 1925
 Taphrocerus aeneocupreus Fisher, 1925
 Taphrocerus agriliformis Kerremans, 1897
 Taphrocerus agriloides Crotch, 1873
 Taphrocerus albodistinctus Knull, 1954
 Taphrocerus albofasciatus Fisher, 1922
 Taphrocerus albomaculatus Fisher, 1928
 Taphrocerus albopictus (Kerremans, 1896)
 Taphrocerus alboplagiatus Kerremans, 1896
 Taphrocerus alutaceicollis Obenberger, 1934
 Taphrocerus amazonicus Kerremans, 1896
 Taphrocerus amplifrons Cobos, 1959
 Taphrocerus angustus (Gory, 1841)
 Taphrocerus argentinus Bruch, 1909
 Taphrocerus attenuatus Fisher, 1922
 Taphrocerus aureomicans Obenberger, 1934
 Taphrocerus aureopilosus Obenberger, 1934
 Taphrocerus balthasari Obenberger, 1934
 Taphrocerus bifasciatus Kerremans, 1900
 Taphrocerus bruchi Obenberger, 1924
 Taphrocerus bruneri Fisher, 1930
 Taphrocerus bucki Cobos, 1958
 Taphrocerus capensis Hespenheide in Bellamy & Hespenheide, 1988
 Taphrocerus carinulosus Obenberger, 1941
 Taphrocerus catacaustus Obenberger, 1941
 Taphrocerus catharinae Obenberger, 1917
 Taphrocerus cayennensis Obenberger, 1934
 Taphrocerus cernosvitovi Obenberger, 1934
 Taphrocerus chalumeaui Hespenheide, 1998
 Taphrocerus chevrolati Obenberger, 1924
 Taphrocerus cocois Bondar, 1922
 Taphrocerus collarti Cobos, 1959
 Taphrocerus colombiae Obenberger, 1934
 Taphrocerus communis Waterhouse, 1889
 Taphrocerus compactus Obenberger, 1934
 Taphrocerus costatus Waterhouse, 1889
 Taphrocerus cupriceps Kerremans, 1900
 Taphrocerus cyanipennis Obenberger, 1934
 Taphrocerus cylindricollis Kerremans, 1896
 Taphrocerus depilis Kerremans, 1896
 Taphrocerus deplanatus Théry, 1923
 Taphrocerus dietzi Fisher, 1933
 Taphrocerus difficilis Obenberger, 1924
 Taphrocerus dudai Obenberger, 1924
 Taphrocerus elegans Fisher, 1925
 Taphrocerus elongatus (Gory, 1841)
 Taphrocerus embriki Obenberger, 1934
 Taphrocerus erbeni Obenberger, 1941
 Taphrocerus exiguus Obenberger, 1934
 Taphrocerus fabichi Obenberger, 1934
 Taphrocerus fasciatus Waterhouse, 1889
 Taphrocerus fastidiosus Cobos, 1959
 Taphrocerus fennahi Théry, 1947
 Taphrocerus finitimus Obenberger, 1924
 Taphrocerus fisherellus Obenberger, 1937
 Taphrocerus fisheri Obenberger, 1924
 Taphrocerus floridanus Obenberger, 1934
 Taphrocerus gentilis (Gory, 1841)
 Taphrocerus gracilis (Say, 1825)
 Taphrocerus gratiosus Obenberger, 1934
 Taphrocerus guttatus Waterhouse, 1889
 Taphrocerus guyanae Obenberger, 1934
 Taphrocerus haenkei Obenberger, 1924
 Taphrocerus haitiensis Fisher, 1949
 Taphrocerus halffteri Cobos, 1978
 Taphrocerus hansi Obenberger, 1924
 Taphrocerus helferi Obenberger, 1924
 Taphrocerus hintoni Fisher, 1938
 Taphrocerus holiki Obenberger, 1924
 Taphrocerus howardi Obenberger, 1934
 Taphrocerus hypocrita Obenberger, 1934
 Taphrocerus innubus (Fabricius, 1801)
 Taphrocerus inusitatus Obenberger, 1941
 Taphrocerus joukli Obenberger, 1924
 Taphrocerus kapczyhaberi Apt, 1954
 Taphrocerus kerremansi Dugès, 1891
 Taphrocerus kheili Obenberger, 1924
 Taphrocerus klimschi Obenberger, 1917
 Taphrocerus kormilevi Cobos, 1956
 Taphrocerus laesicollis Chevrolat, 1867
 Taphrocerus laevicollis LeConte, 1878
 Taphrocerus leoni Dugès, 1891
 Taphrocerus lepidus Obenberger, 1934
 Taphrocerus liliputanus Cobos, 1959
 Taphrocerus loretanus Obenberger, 1934
 Taphrocerus luederwaldti Obenberger, 1934
 Taphrocerus major Cobos, 1978
 Taphrocerus mercedensis White, 1947
 Taphrocerus meridionalis Obenberger, 1934
 Taphrocerus mexicanus Waterhouse, 1889
 Taphrocerus micropilosus Cobos, 1959
 Taphrocerus minutus Kerremans, 1903
 Taphrocerus missionarius Obenberger, 1934
 Taphrocerus modicus Fisher, 1925
 Taphrocerus mrazi Obenberger, 1924
 Taphrocerus nanulus Obenberger, 1934
 Taphrocerus natalensis Cobos, 1967
 Taphrocerus nickerli Obenberger, 1924
 Taphrocerus nicolayi Obenberger, 1924
 Taphrocerus nigritulus Waterhouse, 1889
 Taphrocerus nugator (Gory, 1841)
 Taphrocerus obenbergeri Apt, 1954
 Taphrocerus obscurellus Obenberger, 1934
 Taphrocerus ogloblini Obenberger, 1934
 Taphrocerus olivierai Cobos, 1978
 Taphrocerus orizabae Obenberger, 1934
 Taphrocerus paraguayensis Obenberger, 1924
 Taphrocerus parallelus Kerremans, 1896
 Taphrocerus paranaensis Obenberger, 1924
 Taphrocerus parvus Obenberger, 1924
 Taphrocerus pauligenus Obenberger, 1934
 Taphrocerus pereirai Cobos, 1959
 Taphrocerus pertyi Obenberger, 1934
 Taphrocerus peruvianus Obenberger, 1941
 Taphrocerus pictus Kerremans, 1896
 Taphrocerus politus Cobos, 1967
 Taphrocerus potamicus Obenberger, 1934
 Taphrocerus potamophilus Obenberger, 1934
 Taphrocerus preissi Obenberger, 1924
 Taphrocerus pressli Obenberger, 1924
 Taphrocerus pseudovolitans Obenberger, 1941
 Taphrocerus psilopteroides Waterhouse, 1889
 Taphrocerus pumilus Obenberger, 1934
 Taphrocerus puncticollis Schwarz, 1878
 Taphrocerus punctuliceps Obenberger, 1934
 Taphrocerus purpureipennis Waterhouse, 1889
 Taphrocerus putillus Obenberger, 1934
 Taphrocerus pygmaeus Cobos, 1967
 Taphrocerus quadriplagiatus Obeneberger, 1924
 Taphrocerus rambouseki Obenberger, 1924
 Taphrocerus reimoseri Obenberger, 1924
 Taphrocerus riparius Obenberger, 1934
 Taphrocerus rotundicollis Obenberger, 1924
 Taphrocerus rusticus Thomson, 1879
 Taphrocerus santipauli Obenberger, 1934
 Taphrocerus schaefferi Nicolay & Weiss, 1920
 Taphrocerus scriptus Obenberger, 1924
 Taphrocerus scutellatus Obenberger, 1934
 Taphrocerus sedyi Obenberger, 1924
 Taphrocerus sericans Cobos, 1967
 Taphrocerus sericeicollis Cobos, 1959
 Taphrocerus shannoni Fisher, 1933
 Taphrocerus simillimus Obenberger, 1924
 Taphrocerus singularis Obenberger, 1924
 Taphrocerus squamulatus Kerremans, 1896
 Taphrocerus strandi Obenberger, 1934
 Taphrocerus stygicus Thomson, 1879
 Taphrocerus subcarinulosus Cobos, 1967
 Taphrocerus subglaber Fisher, 1925
 Taphrocerus subpolitus Cobos, 1967
 Taphrocerus sulcifrons Fisher, 1922
 Taphrocerus susterai Obenberger, 1941
 Taphrocerus szekessyi Apt, 1954
 Taphrocerus tao Zayas, 1988
 Taphrocerus temporalis Obenberger, 1934
 Taphrocerus tenellus (Gory, 1841)
 Taphrocerus tennenbaumi Obenberger, 1934
 Taphrocerus tenuis (Kirsch, 1873)
 Taphrocerus tetragraptus Obenberger, 1941
 Taphrocerus theryi Obenberger, 1924
 Taphrocerus tigrensis Obenberger, 1947
 Taphrocerus timidus Chevrolat, 1867
 Taphrocerus troniceki Obenberger, 1937
 Taphrocerus ujhelyii Apt, 1954
 Taphrocerus unicolor Obenberger, 1924
 Taphrocerus volitans (Gory, 1841)
 Taphrocerus wagneri Kerremans, 1913
 Taphrocerus wendleri Obenberger, 1924
 Taphrocerus wimmeri Obenberger, 1924
 Taphrocerus winteri Obenberger, 1924
 Taphrocerus zikani Obenberger, 1924

References

Buprestidae genera